The Kazantypskyi Nature Reserve is a small reserve in the Lenine Raion on the Kerch Peninsula in Crimea. The reserve includes both territory of Cape Kazantyp and coast-aquatic-complex. 

Kazantypskyi Nature Reserve was established in 1998. It is subordinated to the Ministry of Ecology and Natural Resources.
The reserve protects the ecosystems of coastal area and also near coastal sea algae communities. The plant communities are mostly associated to the steppe type.

Despite its small size, the reserve includes 486 kinds of Crimean vascular plants and over one half of the plants of the Kerch peninsula. The fauna includes birds and off-shore species.

The reserve protects virgin ecosystems of coastal areas, including near-coastal sea algae communities. The plant communities are mostly associated with the steppe type.

Kazantypskyi Nature Reserve is listed among the 138 most valuable areas of Ukraine, defined for the Important Bird Area Programme. According to UNESCO, Cape Kazantуp is a reserve of international significance.

Flora and fauna

Flora
 Flora on the IUCN Red List
 Allium pervestitum
 Rumia crithmifolia
 Alyssum calycocarpum
 Papaver maeoticum
 Agropyron cimmericum
 Crataegus taurica

 Flora on the European Red List
 Rumia crithmifolia
 Centaurea aemulans
 Senecio borysthenicus
 Tanacetum paczoskii
 Alyssum calycocarpum
 Crataegus taurica
 Galium xeroticum
 Solanum zelenetzkii

 Flora listed in the Convention on the Conservation of European Wildlife and Natural Habitats
 Crambe koktebelica
 Zostera marina

 Flora in the Red Book of Ukraine
Red Book of Ukraine:
 Allium pervestitum
 Astrodaucus littoralis
 Asparagus brachyphyllus
 Crambe koktebelica
 Silene syreitschikowii
 Silene viridiflora
 Crocus pallasii
 Orchis picta
 Stipa brauneri
 Stipa capillata
 Stipa lessingiana
 Stipa poetica
 Stipa ucrainica

Fauna
 Fauna listed in the Red Book of Ukraine
 Rhinolophus ferrumequinum
 Tursiops truncates ponticus
 Phocana phocana relicta
 Mustela eversmanni
 Tadorna ferruginea
 Falco naumanni
 Himantopus himantopus
 Heamatopus ostralegus
 Egretta garszetta
 Aguila rapax
 Ophisaurus apodus
 Coluber jugularis
 Elaphe quatuorlineata
 Vipera ursini renardi

 Fauna listed on the European Red List
 Phocana phocana relicta
 Falco naumanni

 Fauna listed in the Convention on the Conservation of European Wildlife and Natural Habitats
 Crocidura suaveolens
 Pipistrellus pipistrellus
 Tursiops truncatus ponticus
 Phocana phocana relicta
 Mustela eversmanni
 Gulosus aristotelis
 Tadorna ferruginea
 Burhinus oedicnemus
 Charadrius dubius
 Casmerodius (Egretta) alba
 Upupa epops
 Bufo viridis
 Ophisaurus apodus
 Natrix tessellata
 Vipera ursini renardi

References

 
 
 
 

Nature reserves in Ukraine
Kerch Peninsula
Geography of Crimea